Ayacucho Municipality may refer to:
 Ayacucho Municipality, Santa Cruz, Bolivia
 Ayacucho Municipality, Táchira, Venezuela

Municipality name disambiguation pages